This is a list of characters who appear in the TV series Static Shock.

Main characters

Virgil Hawkins
Virgil Ovid Hawkins, also known as Static (voiced by Phil LaMarr), is an African-American high school student from Dakota City who, as a result of being accidental exposed to an experimental mutagen in an event called the "Big Bang", gained the ability to control and manipulate electromagnetism. After discovering others like himself, nicknamed "Bang Babies", using their powers for criminal pursuits, Virgil becomes a hero to stop them. Virgil is an intelligent young man with a strong sense of justice, but grapples with self-doubt. Over the course of the series, he gradually becomes more mature and responsible with his powers.

Richie Foley
Richard "Richie" Osgood Foley (voiced by Jason Marsden) is Virgil Hawkins' best friend who supports the latter as Static by developing gadgets for him during seasons one and two. In the latter season, Foley encounters Ragtag, who grants him the power to repel or deflect objects via purple energy. Taking the name "Push", he becomes addicted and begins stealing for Ragtag in exchange for him maintaining his powers, but eventually sees the error of his ways and helps Virgil defeat Ragtag. In season three, due to prolonged exposure to Virgil, Foley becomes a Bang Baby with superhuman intelligence and limited technopathy. Using his newfound powers, he builds advanced technology, such as the robot "Back-Pack", and joins Virgil in fighting crime as the superhero Gear.

According to series creators, Richie's character was based on Rick Stone, Virgil's best friend in the comics, who is gay. Since Stone's sexual orientation could not be explored within the context of a children's television series at the time of the show's original run, it was never addressed if Foley was gay as well, though series creator Dwayne McDuffie did consider him gay and subtly hinted at such throughout the series.

Robert Hawkins
Robert Hawkins (voiced by Kevin Michael Richardson) is a strict yet caring widowed social worker and head counselor of the Freeman Community Center who served in the Marines and strongly dislikes gangs and the destructive attitudes of most Bang Babies, which motivates him to counteract bad influences on young people. Throughout most of the series, he remains unaware of his son Virgil's actions as Static, whose actions he disapproves of, until he is kidnapped and deduces Virgil's secret identity near the end of the series, but agrees to keep it secret.

Sharon Hawkins
Sharon Hawkins (voiced by Michele Morgan) is Virgil's strong-willed and caring older sister who attends college, but still lives at home, and remains unaware of Virgil's activities as Static throughout the series. Additionally, she volunteers at a hospital and works as counselor at the Freeman Community Center. Despite frequently arguing with Virgil, she still cares for him.

Francis Stone

Francis "F-Stop" Stone (voiced by Danny Cooksey) is a hot-headed and wisecracking bully at Dakota Union High School who was the leader of one of the gangs that took part in the gang war that would later erupt into the "Big Bang", during which he acquired pyrokinetic powers. Taking the name "Hot-Streak", he serves as Static's first rival and maintains this rivalry with him throughout the series due in part to their prior history before the Big Bang.

After Dr. Todd creates and disperses a "Bang Baby cure" in the series finale, Stone takes part in Ebon's plot to steal a canister of the mutagen used in the original Big Bang and stage a larger one to restore their powers along with those of their allies. After Static and Gear foil their plot, Ebon and Stone fight over the mutagen canister, but become exposed to a large quantity of the gas and fuse together into a giant monster with both of their powers called "Ebon-Streak". Static and Gear eventually defeat them, though their fates following this are left unknown.

Ebon
Ebon, also known as Ivan Evans (voiced by Gary Anthony Sturgis), is a Bang Baby criminal, leader of the Meta-Breed, and older brother of Rubber-Band Man who resembles an anthropomorphic shadow and possesses powerful umbrakinetic abilities that allow him to create portals to teleport himself or others and control and manipulate darkness and other shadows, though he is vulnerable to strong sources of light. Throughout the series, he attempts to recruit new and powerful Bang Babies into the Meta-Breed, only to continually face opposition from Static and later Gear.

After Dr. Todd creates and disperses a "Bang Baby cure", Ebon launches a plot to steal a canister of the mutagen used in the original Big Bang and stage a larger one to restore his and other like-minded Bang Babies' powers, despite the risk of creating hundreds more. After Static and Gear foil their plot, Ebon and Hot-Streak fight over the mutagen canister, but become exposed to a large quantity of the gas that fuses them together into a giant monster with both of their powers called "Ebon-Streak". Static and Gear eventually defeat them, though their fates following this are left unknown.

Recurring characters

Edwin Alva
Edwin Alva (voiced by Kerrigan Mahan) is a businessman and head of Alva Industries who neglects and holds contempt for his son, Edwin Alva Jr., which would lead to the latter becoming a supervillain and being turned to stone while seeking his attention. In response, a guilt-ridden Alva Sr. focuses his efforts on saving his son, which he eventually succeeds in with Static, Gear, and Hot-Streak's help.

Series creator Dwayne McDuffie has said that the character was supposed to have been "more Peter O'Toole than Peter Fonda".

The Meta-Breed
The Meta-Breed is a criminal group of Bang Babies led by Ebon.

Shiv

Shiv (voiced by Brian Tochi) is an eccentric and immature member of the Meta-Breed with the ability to form "light energy" constructs from his arms and hands, which he can form into blades and other weapons.

Talon
Talon, real name Teresa (voiced by Tia Texada), is a teenage Hispanic member of the Meta-Breed who resembles an anthropomorphic bird and possesses wings that allow her to fly, her namesakes on her hands and feet, and a hypersonic shriek. Embittered over her transformation, she aids Ebon and the Meta-Breed throughout the series until Dr. Todd creates and disperses a "Bang Baby cure" in the series finale. After being hospitalized, Talon quits the Meta-Breed and tells Static and Gear about Ebon's plot to stage a new Big Bang to restore his powers. Ebon kidnaps Talon to restore her powers as well, but Static and Gear rescue her.

Rubber-Band Man
Rubber-Band Man, also known as Adam Evans (voiced by Kadeem Hardison), is a dyslexic yet talented musician, younger brother of Ebon, and a Bang Baby whose body structure consists of living rubber, which he can shape into a variety of forms and use to disguise himself as others. Prior to becoming a Bang Baby, Rubber-Band Man worked as a stock clerk at a music store before he joined Ebon's gang in taking part in the gang war that would later erupt into the Big Bang. In season one, Rubber-Band Man seeks revenge on a record producer who stole one of his songs. Despite being defeated by Static and arrested by authorities, Rubber-Band Man breaks out of prison and disguises himself as a musician named "Stringer". After entering a relationship with Sharon Hawkins, he becomes inspired to reform and become a superhero in season two. He initially clashes with Static, but eventually serves as an older brother figure to him.

Puff
Puff (voiced by Kimberly Brooks) is a volatile and hot-tempered Bang Baby bounty hunter and partner of Onyx with the ability to transform into a gaseous form, which grants flight capabilities and semi-intangibility, but renders her vulnerable to water and large gusts of wind. Additionally, she can also exhale different forms of vapor depending on her mood such as acidic gas, "Puff Darts", knockout gas, and flammable gas.

Onyx
Onyx (voiced by Kevin Michael Richardson) is a calm and cool-headed Bang Baby bounty hunter and partner of Puff with a purple stone-like body that grants superhuman strength and durability, but slows his movements.

Guest characters
 Frieda Goren (voiced by Danica McKellar) - A friend of Virgil's and his initial crush. Though lively and popular at Dakota Union High School, being an active participant and the driving force behind the school's newspaper, she tends to be short-tempered and impulsive, earning her the nickname "Hurricane Frieda".
 Wade (voiced by Omar Gooding) - Hot-Streak's rival and a gang leader who convinces Virgil to take part in the gang war that would later erupt into the Big Bang.
Derek Barnett / D-Struct (voiced by Bumper Robinson): A track athlete who suffered a delayed reaction following the Big Bang and was cloaked in a shroud composed of compressed ionic energy, causing him to resemble a monster. Believing he had no other choice, he joins Ebon's Meta-Breed, but Static persuades Barnett to quit the gang and return to his mother. Following this, Barnett volunteers to become a test subject in Bang Baby research.
 Carmen Dillo (voiced by Matt Ballard in seasons 1–2, Jason Marsden in seasons 2–4): A Bang Baby resembling an anthropomorphic armadillo who possesses a durable carapace and the ability to curl up into a ball and roll at high speeds. He lives in garbage cans and primarily steals food. While he prefers to work alone, he temporarily aligns himself with Ebon's Meta-Breed, Puff's short-lived Meta-Men, and a dog-like Bang Baby known as "Chomper" throughout the series.
 Daisy Watkins (voiced by Crystal Scales) - A student of the Vanmoor Institute, through which she meets Virgil, before transferring to Dakota Union High School.
 "Specs and Trapper" / Spectral and Speed-Trap (voiced by Patton Oswalt and Michael Rosenbaum respectively): Two self-centered students of the Vanmoor Institute who consider themselves smarter than everyone else. Edwin Alva Sr. hires them to capture Static and cure his son Edwin Alva Jr., who had been petrified into a stone statue. After being defeated by Static in their first encounter however, Specs and Trapper build a visor capable of firing energy blasts of varying effects and speed-manipulating gauntlets respectively to become supervillains and seek revenge on Static instead. Ultimately, they are fired by Alva Sr. and defeated by Static once more, after which Specs and Trapper are arrested and tried as adults. Sometime later, having broken out of prison and become independent, they hire Tarmack to steal a cold fusion engine from Alva Industries for them so they can seek revenge on Alva Sr. and ransom Dakota. After Tarmack steals the engine for himself, Static and Gear defeat Specs and Trapper once again while Rubber-Band Man subdues Tarmack and disables the engine.
Dwayne McCall (voiced by Blayn Barbosa): A shy, misguided young boy who possesses reality-warping powers, which he primarily uses to conjure his favorite characters into reality. After his stepbrother Aron Price discovers his abilities, the latter manipulates McCall into helping him commit crimes until Static discovers them and convinces McCall of the truth.
 Aron Price (voiced by R.J. Knoll): A teenage boy who hangs out with unruly crowds and refuses to spend time with his stepbrother Dwayne McCall. Due to being in reform school during the Big Bang and after discovering McCall has powers, Price manipulates him into helping him commit crimes until Static discovers and reveals Price's true feelings towards McCall. Upon learning the truth, McCall stops aiding Price, who is subsequently pinned to a wall by Static and left for the arriving police.
 Sean Foley (voiced by Dan Lauria) - Richie's tough, blue-collar father who is racist towards African-Americans, though he resolves to change his ways upon realizing he was hurting his relationship with his son.
 Maggie Foley (voiced by Jean Smart) - Richie's soft-spoken yet open-minded mother. 
 "Heavy-C" / Slipstream (voiced by Bumper Robinson): A heavy-set teenage bully who steals others' food and suffered a delayed reaction to the Big Bang. Upon gaining aerokinetic abilities, he becomes a supervillain until Static defeats him. After Dr. Todd creates and disperses a "Bang Baby cure", Slipstream joins Ebon and other Bang Babies in a failed attempt at regaining their powers.
 Edwin Alva Jr. / Omnifarious (voiced by Matt Ballard): The scientifically gifted son of Edwin Alva Sr. who, in the hopes of gaining his father's attention and respect, steals a canister of the mutagen used in the Big Bang and invents a suit capable of controlling it to grant himself a variety of different powers. Alva Jr. attacks Alva Industries properties and discovers Static's secret identity along the way, but fails to gain his father's respect. Outraged by this, Alva Jr. attempts to destroy Alva Industries' corporate headquarters using all of his powers at once, but is overloaded by them and petrifies. This would lead to Alva Sr. going to great lengths to revive his son, which he eventually succeeds in with Static, Gear, and Hot-Streak's help.
 Johnny Morrow / Replay (voiced by Neil Patrick Harris): A washed-up child star who acquired the ability to replicate himself following the "Big Bang". He goes on a crime spree until an encounter with Static leads to him accidentally creating a clone of the hero. With the clone Static's assistance, Replay frames the original and attempts to become famous again, but Static and Richie clear the former's name and defeat Replay.
 Thomas Kim / Tantrum (voiced by John Cho): An intelligent, weak-willed teenage Bang Baby who transforms into a purple-skinned, muscular, and violent monster whenever he gets angry. Due to varying circumstances, he transforms into Tantrum and attacks people who angered him. Recalling his mother's advice of letting people work through their anger, Static leads Kim to an abandoned amusement park to let him rampage without hurting anyone until he tires out and turns back. Following this, Static tells Kim's over-demanding parents what happened to help him work out his problems.
 Jean Hawkins (voiced by Alfre Woodard): A paramedic, Robert Hawkins' wife, and Virgil and Sharon's mother who was killed during the Dakota Riots five years prior to the series. After being accidentally sent back in time to the Dakota Riots, Static attempts to save her, but she expresses how proud she is of him before she is killed while resuming her duties.
 Shaquille O'Neal (voiced by himself): An American professional basketball player who helps Static defeat the Rough Pack.
 Hyde (voiced by Tone Lōc): A Bang Baby with thick folded skin that renders him tougher and stronger than regular humans and leader of the short-lived Rough Pack. After Static foils one of their crimes, Hyde leads the gang in seeking revenge on him, only to be defeated by him and Shaquille O'Neal.
 Kangor (voiced by Kevin Michael Richardson): A Jamaican-American Bang Baby who gained enhanced lower body strength and increased bone and muscle mass in his feet, granting superhuman jumping and kicking capabilities. Throughout the series, he allies himself with Hyde's short-lived Rough Pack and the Joker before eventually being cured in the series finale.
 Ferret (voiced by Chick Vennera): A Bang Baby with an elongated muzzle that grants an enhanced olfactory system and clawed digits. Due to his lack of combat prowess and offensive abilities, he allies himself with more powerful individuals such as Hyde's short-lived Rough Pack, the Joker, and Ebon's Meta-Breed throughout the series before eventually being cured in the series finale.
 The Joker (voiced by Mark Hamill): A clown-esque supervillain from Gotham City who comes to Dakota to recruit Bang Babies.
 Bruce Wayne / Batman (voiced by Kevin Conroy): A superhero from Gotham City and a member of the Justice League who pursues the Joker to Dakota to stop him, working with Static along the way. In subsequent appearances, Batman joins forces with Static to defeat Harley Quinn, Poison Ivy, and Brainiac.
 Tim Drake / Robin (voiced by Eli Marienthal in "The Big Leagues" and Shane Sweet in "Future Shock"): Batman's sidekick who joins him in traveling to Dakota to stop the Joker.
 Ragtag (voiced by Richard Libertini): A Fagin-esque, homeless old man and Bang Baby who gained the ability to temporarily grant others powers, along with an addictive desire after they wear off, and steal other metahumans' powers. He forces the people he empowers to steal for him in exchange for him "recharging" them until Static and Richie Foley defeat him.
 Run and Jump (voiced by Philip Tanzini and Kenny Blank respectively): Teenagers that Ragtag granted super-speed and teleportation to respectively who serve him to maintain their powers.
 Byron / Boom (voiced by Rickey D'Shon Collins): A teenage boy who, along with his younger sister Miranda, were taken in by their grandmother after both of their parents died. After being exposed to spilled mutagen amidst a clean-up effort following the Big Bang, Byron gained a loudspeaker in his chest that allows him to fire powerful hypersonic soundwaves and became more aggressive. He coerces Miranda into helping him commit robberies so he can relive the wealthy lifestyle he previously lived by claiming they are supporting their grandmother. However, Miranda helps Static defeat Byron. After Dr. Todd creates and disperses a "Bang Baby cure", Byron joins Ebon and other Bang Babies in a failed attempt at regaining their powers.
 Miranda / Mirage (voiced by Gavin Turek): A young girl who, along with her older brother Byron, were taken in by their grandmother after both of their parents died. After being exposed to spilled mutagen amidst a clean-up effort following the Big Bang, Miranda gained photokinesis, which allows her to create illusions. Byron coerces her into helping him commit robberies, claiming it is to support their grandmother. Seeing that the mutagen had corrupted him, Miranda joins forces with Static to defeat him. As she is taken away by child protective services, she returns the favor by creating an illusion of Static to convince his sister Sharon Hawkins that he and Virgil are not the same person.
 Maureen Connor / Permafrost (voiced by Hynden Walch): A mentally-ill preteen who was left homeless following her mother's death and her step-father's desertion. Following the Big Bang, she gained powerful cryokinetic abilities. She inadvertently causes trouble with her powers during Christmas until Static learns of her past and reaches out to her. Following this, she is taken in by a church's homeless program.
 Royce Axelrod (voiced by Bumper Robinson): An aggressive and arrogant student at Dakota Union High School and juvenile delinquent with kleptomania. He and his acquaintance Frankie steal a briefcase, only to find three vials of mutagen previously used in the Big Bang. Hoping to sell them off, Axelrod keeps it hidden while Frankie uses the accompanying papers to unlock the vials. Once the latter does so, Axelrod inhales some of the gas. The next day, having grown larger and stronger, Axelrod abandons Frankie to drink the mutagen and enhance himself further, only to spontaneously mutate into a misshapen blob with a primitive mindset. He attacks anyone who gets too close until Static eventually restrains him.
 Frankie (voiced by Rel Hunt): A student at Dakota Union High School and juvenile delinquent who clings onto Royce Axelrod.
 Trina Jessup (voiced by Sheryl Lee Ralph) - An officer of the Dakota Police Department and Robert Hawkins' girlfriend.
 Maria / Aquamaria (voiced by Erika Velez in "Bad Stretch" and Yeni Álvarez in "Wet and Wild"): A Hispanic Bang Baby who was transformed into a hydrokinetic being of living water, though she lacks the ability to change back into her human form. Due to her transformation, she left behind a mother and sister to join Ebon's Meta-Breed, only to be defeated by Static and arrested by the authorities. Eventually, she is chosen by a team of scientists to become the first test subject for a "Bang Baby cure", regaining her human form in the process.
 Madelyn Spaulding (voiced by Kimberly Brooks): A self-centered, opinionated, controlling, and unpopular student at Dakota Union High School with no sense of self-examination. After getting caught in the Big Bang, she gained telepathy and mind control, which she uses to turn most of Dakota into "brain puppets" and discover Static's identity. She attempts to brainwash him as well, but his powers hospitalize her, negate her powers, and erase her memory of being a Bang Baby. After eventually being released from the hospital, she is barred from school, reluctantly finds work in a comic book store, and partially regains her memory of fighting Static. Upon gaining telekinesis, she takes over the Meta-Breed, but Static subdues her once more and defeats the Meta-Breed with Gear and She-Bang's help.
 AJ McLean (voiced by himself): A former member of the Backstreet Boys who assists Rubber-Band Man in getting a record deal.
 Marvin Roper / Replikon (voiced by Coolio): A musically untalented Bang-Baby shapeshifter capable of disguising himself as others and altering his molecular structure. Jealous of his former coworker, Rubber-Band Man's, talent for music and rising success, Replikon uses his powers to seek revenge by capturing and posing as AJ McLean to steal a record deal from Rubber-Band Man. However, Replikon is exposed and defeated by Static.
 Jimmy Osgood (voiced by Richard Steven Horvitz) - A shy, troubled student at Dakota Union High School and friend of Virgil and Richie's who is constantly bullied by Nick Connor and his friends, Kevin and Ray. Growing tired of Connor, Jimmy steals his father's gun and threatens Connor with it. Frieda and Richie calm Jimmy down, but Kevin and Ray tackle him, causing the gun to go off and shoot Richie in the leg. Aghast at the scene, Jimmy suffers a mental breakdown and is taken to receive treatment at a youth detention center.
 Nick Connor (voiced by Mikey Kelley): A school bully who targets the sheepish Jimmy Osgood, along with his friends, Kevin and Ray. After stuffing Jimmy into a locker, Nick is confronted the next day by Jimmy, who had stolen his father's gun. While Frieda and Richie talk Jimmy out of his rage, he is tackled by Kevin and Ray, causing the gun to go off and shoot Richie in the leg. Following the incident, Connor and his cohorts are suspended from school and sentenced to community service.
 Allie Langford / Nails (voiced by T'Keyah Crystal Keymáh): A teenage girl who experienced a delayed reaction to the Big Bang and was transmuted into an organic metal form that grants superhuman strength and resilience as well the ability to extend, discharge, and regenerate her sharpened fingernails. While hiding her condition from her peers and loved ones, she desperately searches for a cure on the internet and learns of a supposed Bang Baby clinic in Gotham City. She travels there, only to be manipulated by Harley Quinn and Poison Ivy into helping them hijack a ship containing gold bars in exchange for a cure the pair later reveal is fake. After Batman and Static defeat the villains, Langford tries to take revenge on them, but Static talks her out of it. She later reunites with her family, receives sponsorship for a treatment program at a proper Bang Baby clinic established by Bruce Wayne, and gains control over her powers.
 Dr. Harleen Quinzel / Harley Quinn and Dr. Pamela Isley / Poison Ivy (voiced by Arleen Sorkin and Diane Pershing respectively): A pair of supervillains from Gotham City who manipulate Nails into helping them hijack a ship carrying gold bars before they are foiled by Batman and Static.
 Anansi the Spider (voiced by Carl Lumbly): A superhero native to Ghana inspired by his mythological namesake who possesses an ancient, golden spider talisman that grants illusionary powers and the ability to cling to and walk on walls and ceilings.
 Osebo (voiced by Michael Jai White): An anthropomorphic striped leopard with a metal fist and enemy of Anansi who takes inspiration from his mythological namesake.
 Shenice Vale / She-Bang (voiced by Rosslynn Taylor-Jordan): A genetically engineered teenager with superhuman strength, stamina, agility, reflexes, and endurance who was created by her scientist parents, Jonathan and Dolores. Fearing that the company they worked for, Ashton Biotechnics, would abuse her, the Vales went into hiding in Dakota, where Shenice passes herself off as a Bang Baby and joins Static and Gear in fighting crime.
 Jonathan Vale (voiced by Phil Morris) - A scientist, former worker at Ashton Biotechnics, and husband of Dolores Vale who created Shenice, who they raised as their own.
 Dolores Vale (voiced by Pamela Tyson in "She-Bang" and Kimberly Brooks in "The Parent Trap") - A scientist, former worker at Ashton Biotechnics, and wife of Jonathan who created Shenice, who they raised as their own.
 Crewcut (voiced by Charles Rocket): A mercenary hired by Ashton Biotechnics to capture Jonathan and Dolores Vale, only to be defeated by Static and Gear and arrested by the FBI.
 Tamara Lawrence (voiced by Airyan Johnson): A teenager who was caught in the Big Bang and gained the ability to transform into a monster (voiced by Dee Bradley Baker) with superhuman strength coupled with increased sensitivity to loud noises. She seeks revenge on her ex-boyfriend, Marcus Reed, for breaking up with her by framing him for her monster attacks. However, Static eventually discovers the truth and incapacitates her with a merry-go-round's music before she is taken into custody. After Dr. Todd creates and disperses a "Bang Baby cure", she joins Ebon and other Bang Babies in a failed attempt at regaining their powers.
 The Justice League: A group of superheroes, of which Batman and Superman are members, who join forces with Static and Gear to defeat Brainiac.
 John Stewart / Green Lantern (voiced by Phil Lamarr): A Leaguer and member of the Green Lantern Corps with a power ring that allows him to create hard-light constructs. In a later appearance, he seeks out Static's help in clearing his name after Sinestro steals his Power Battery and frames him for several crimes.
 Wally West / Flash (voiced by Michael Rosenbaum): A Leaguer with super-speed.
 J'onn J'onzz / Martian Manhunter (voiced by Carl Lumbly): A Martian Leaguer with numerous powers.
 Shayera Hol / Hawkgirl (voiced by Maria Canals-Barrera): A Thanagarian Leaguer with bird-like wings and a Nth Metal mace.
 Brainiac (voiced by Corey Burton): An alien supercomputer and enemy of Superman and the Justice League.
 Bernie Rast (voiced by Kevin Michael Richardson) - A sleazy, loudmouthed TV producer who is always on the look out for a big hit to promote his clients and himself.
 Brandon / Starburst (voiced by David Faustino): A disgruntled employee of Bernie Rast's. After learning Rast is making a TV series about Static and Gear, Brandon uses his technological expertise to create a suit capable of absorbing electricity to humiliate Static and steal money to produce his screenplay, though Static and Gear eventually defeat Brandon.
 Lil' Romeo (voiced by himself): A young rapper and actor who comes to Dakota to film a music video about Static.
 The Leech (voiced by David Arquette): A green-skinned metahuman capable of temporarily siphoning the powers and weaknesses of other metahumans. He kidnaps Ebon, Hot-Streak, Talon, and Static for their powers, but Static and Lil' Romeo defeat him.
 Winslow Schott Jr. / Toyman (voiced by Bud Cort): A toy-themed supervillain from Metropolis and enemy of Superman who comes to Dakota to create a new body for his android, Darci.
 Kal-El / Clark Kent / Superman (voiced by George Newbern): A Kryptonian superhero from Metropolis and member of the Justice League who pursues Toyman to Dakota and joins forces with Static to stop him.
 Dr. Koenig / Heavyman (voiced by Ron Perlman): A former scientist at Ashton Biotechnics who worked with Jonathan and Dolores Vale on a project involving more efficient cellular metabolism until the project was cancelled. Though the Vales moved on, Koenig refused to and used himself as a test subject, gaining superhuman strength and durability and the ability to absorb inorganic matter. In the present, he kidnaps the Vales and threatens to kill them unless they create an antidote for his condition. However, the antidote fails as he has absorbed too much matter, and he is eventually rendered immobile and arrested by government officials.
 Nina Crocker / Time-Zone (voiced by Rachael MacFarlane): A Bang Baby with uncontrollable time traveling capabilities. After seeking out Static and Gear's help in escaping from Ebon and becoming a superhero, Gear creates a remote and belt to help her control her powers. However, an encounter with Ebon makes Crocker realize her powers are too dangerous for anyone to have, so she travels back in time to stop herself from being present at the Big Bang. As a result, she now lives a happy, ordinary life with no memory of being a Bang Baby.
 Morris Grant / Soul Power (voiced by Brock Peters): An elderly, retired superhero who protected Dakota in the 1960s after gaining similar powers to Static during an accident at Hoover Dam. After his arch-nemesis, Professor Menace, resurfaces in the present, Soul Power reunites with his sidekick Sparky and joins forces with Static to defeat him.
 Phillip Rollins / Sparky (voiced by Rodney Saulsberry): Soul Power's sidekick who donned a suit that he invented to mimic Soul Power and joined him in fighting crime in the 1970s before becoming a meteorologist in the present. After Soul Power's arch-nemesis, Professor Menace, resurfaces, Sparky reluctantly joins forces with Soul Power and Static to defeat him.
 Dennis / Professor Menace (voiced by Terence Stamp): An elderly mad scientist and enemy of Soul Power who disappeared in 1963 before resurfacing in the present to seek revenge on Soul Power, only to be defeated by him, Sparky, and Static.
 Terry McGinnis / Batman (voiced by Will Friedle): Bruce Wayne's successor from 40 years in the future who joins forces with Static and the latter's adult self to defeat Kobra.
 Kobra Leader (voiced by Lance Henriksen): The unnamed leader of the terrorist organization Kobra, which has had several previous encounters with McGinnis.
 Mmoboro (voiced by Phil LaMarr): A giant green hornet who can turn into a swarm of smaller wasps and enemy of Anansi who takes inspiration from his mythological namesake.
 Onini (voiced by Kevin Michael Richardson): A giant black python and enemy of Anansi who takes inspiration from his mythological namesake.
 Sinestro (voiced by Ted Levine): A enemy of the Green Lantern Corps who possesses his own power ring. He steals Green Lantern's Power Battery and frames him for several crimes until he is exposed and defeated by Static and Green Lantern.
 The Night-Breed: A group of yellow-eyed, photosensitive Bang Babies who are forced to live underground. Ebon recruits them to plunge Dakota into darkness, but Static and Gear convince some of the Night-Breed to help them stop him.
Gail / Nightingale (voiced by Colleen O'Shaughnessey): A Bang Baby who can generate and manipulate dark matter, which she uses to protect herself and her fellow Night-Breed. After reluctantly taking part in Ebon's plot, she helps Static and Gear defeat him.
 Brickhouse (voiced by Dawnn Lewis): Nightingale's best friend who gained the ability to transmute her body into a living brick-like state. After Gail turns against Ebon, Brickhouse joins her in doing the same.
 Tech (voiced by Freddy Rodriguez): A Bang Baby with superhuman intelligence. He willingly helps Ebon in his plot until Static and Gear thwart the latter, after which Tech decides to work on a cure for the Night-Breed's photosensitivity.
 Fade (voiced by Freddy Rodriguez): A Bang Baby who can turn intangible. He sides with Ebon until the latter is foiled.
 The Hoop Squad: A group of NBA players who secretly operate as superheroes via bio-enhancer super-suits created by Dr. Mason Andrews.
 Karl Malone / Pulverizer (voiced by himself): A member of the Hoop Squad whose suit allows him to increase the size of his hands.
 Tracy McGrady / Spin Drive (voiced by Phil LaMarr): A member of the Hoop Squad whose suit allows him to rotate his body at super-speed and create vortexes.
 Yao Ming / Centerforce (voiced by Jen Sung Outerbridge): A member of the Hoop Squad whose suit allows him to extend his limbs.
 Steve Nash / Point Man (voiced by Chris Cox): A member of the Hoop Squad whose suit allows him to fire various types of projectiles from his fingertips.
 Doctor Odium (voiced by David Ogden Stiers): A mad scientist, expert in bio-tactical artificial intelligence and robotics, and enemy of the Hoop Squad. He used to work for the NBA until he turned traitor when the government refused to let him test his nanites on humans. After perfecting his nanites, they trapped him in cryogenic stasis, formed a construct resembling him, and extort the NBA. After capturing Gear, the nanites attempt to recruit him, but are defeated by Static and the Hoop Squad.
 Eddie Felson / Speedwarp (voiced by James Arnold Taylor): A teenager who was known as "the nerd who all the other nerds would pick on" and "Weird Eddie" and had developed an obsessive crush on Daisy. After stealing a "Time Gauntlet", which allows the wearer to move at super-speed, from the laboratory he interns at, he steals gifts for and later stalks Daisy, discovers Static and Gear's secret identities, and makes a failed attempt on his boss, Dr. McDonald's, life. Gear later acquires McDonald's notes and uses them to create a one-use-only "Time Belt" for Static so he can stop Felson. In the ensuing battle, the former causes the Time Gauntlet to malfunction and leave Felson moving in slow-motion.
 Tarmack (voiced by John DiMaggio): A dimwitted Bang Baby resembling anthropomorphic tarmac who is as strong and tough as tar and able to melt obstacles, though he is vulnerable to water. Specs and Trapper recruit him to steal a cold fusion engine for them, but Tarmack steals it for himself until Static, Gear, and Rubber-Band Man defeat the villains.
Dulé Jones (voiced by Marshall "Rock" Jones): A former gang member and Bang Baby with retractable metallic tentacles growing from his back. Following the Big Bang, he gave up his gang lifestyle to pursue professional football. However, his brother Chainlink extorts him, threatening to reveal his secret. In their ensuing fight, Dulé goes public and receives help from Static, Gear, and several football players in defeating Chainlink.
 Troy / Chainlink (voiced by Bumper Robinson): A former gang member, Bang Baby, and brother of Dulé Jones who also acquired metallic tentacles growing from his back, though he is unable to retract them and gained the additional ability to absorb metal objects to strengthen himself as he was exposed to more gas than Dulé. Jealous of his brother's successful football career, Chainlink attempts to extort Dulé, only to be defeated by him, Static, Gear, and several football players and arrested by the police.
 Dr. Donald Todd (voiced by Ed Begley Jr.) - A scientist at GenomaTech who works on a cure for Bang Babies.
 Dr. Karen Roberts / Omnara (voiced by Wendie Malick): A scientist for Alva Industries who was in charge of a project meant to find and expose Static's secret identity before Edwin Alva Sr. cut off her funding following his son, Edwin Alva Jr.'s, revival. Angry at Alva Sr. for this, she discovers Static's identity for herself and hires Puff and Onyx to kidnap Robert Hawkins to blackmail Static into stealing components necessary for her plot to control every computer in the world. However, Gear develops an anti-virus to stop Omnara, who suffers brain damage due to being connected to her machinery at the time and is taken away by paramedics.

External links
 Static Shock at The World's Finest

 
Lists of DC Comics animated television characters
Lists of DC Comics supervillains
Fictional shapeshifters
Lists of characters in American television animation